Redress is a setting right, as of injury, oppression, or wrong. Redress may refer to:

 Redress of grievances or right to petition
 Redress of grievances in the United States
 Legal redress
 Redress (charitable organisation)
 Redress Control Number, an identification number issued to travelers who would otherwise be subjected to excessive scrutiny at U.S. security checkpoints
 REDress Project, a Canadian public art installation
 Collective redress, a legal concept
 Japanese American redress and court cases
 Japanese Canadian Redress, a 1988 agreement regarding the internment of Japanese Canadians during World War II

See also
set redress